Sarab-e Siah (also Romanized as Sarāb-e Sīāh; also known as Sarāb-e Shāh Neshīn and Sarāb-e Shān Neshīn) is a village in Rostam-e Do Rural District, in the Central District of Rostam County, Fars Province, Iran. At the 2006 census, its population was 209, in 37 families.

References 

Populated places in Rostam County